The 2005 Russian Cup Final decided the winner of the 2004–05 Russian Cup, the 13th season of Russia's main football cup. It was played on 29 May 2005 at the Lokomotiv Stadium in Moscow, between CSKA Moscow and Khimki. CSKA Moscow emerged victorious with a 1-0 win thanks to a 68th minute header from Yuri Zhirkov.

Match

Details

References

2005 Russian Cup Final
Cup
Russian Cup
Sports competitions in Moscow
2005 Russian Cup Final
FC Khimki matches